Lee Valley Leisure Complex is located at Edmonton, London, and is part of the Lee Valley Park.  It was formerly known as the Picketts Lock Sports Centre.  It now comprises an 18-hole golf course which borders the River Lee Navigation, camping site, indoor bowls club (housed in the remains of the now-demolished Picketts Lock Sports Centre), multiplex cinema and restaurants.  A new athletics centre was formally opened on 16 January 2007.  The complex is owned and managed by the Lee Valley Regional Park Authority (LVRPA).

External links 
 Picketts Lock Indoor Bowls Club

Transport 
 Vehicular access Meridian Way A1055
 Nearest railway station Ponders End railway station
 London Bus Route W8 Metroline

References 

Sport in the London Borough of Enfield
Lee Valley Park
Edmonton, London